Pedro José Barrancos Miras (born 10 March 1988) is a Spanish professional footballer who plays for Orihuela CF as a forward.

Club career
Born in Murcia, Barrancos was a Real Murcia youth graduate. On 17 June 2006, without even appearing for the reserves he made his professional debut, playing the last 16 minutes of a 0–1 away loss against Sporting de Gijón in the Segunda División.

In the 2008 summer Barrancos was loaned to Tercera División's Sangonera Atlético CF, appearing regularly and winning promotion at the end of the campaign. On 16 June 2010, he signed a four-year deal with Granada CF, newly promoted to the second level.

After appearing only in a Copa del Rey match against Real Betis for the Andalusians, Barrancos was loaned to Segunda División B club UD Logroñés on 28 December, until the end of the season. He subsequently served another temporary spell at Cádiz CF and Caravaca CF, and on 1 August 2012 he rescinded his link, joining UCAM Murcia CF a day later.

On 9 January 2013 Barrancos moved abroad for the first time in his career, joining Greek Football League side Iraklis Psachna F.C. In June, however, he returned to his native country and joined former club UCAM Murcia, now in the fourth level.

On 20 July 2014 Barrancos moved to Arroyo CP, in the third division. In January of the following year he rescinded his link and moved to fourth level's Orihuela CF.

References

External links
 
 

1988 births
Living people
Association football forwards
Footballers from Murcia
Spanish footballers
Real Murcia players
Granada CF footballers
UD Logroñés players
Cádiz CF players
Orihuela CF players
Iraklis Psachna F.C. players
Segunda División B players
Tercera División players
Segunda División players
Football League (Greece) players
Caravaca CF players